This article details the 2012 Indian Federation Cup Qualifiers.

Format
The qualifiers will start from 11 September to 16 September 2012 and will consist of 6 teams, 5 of which played in the 2012 I-League 2nd Division Final Round and the other one being HAL Sporting Club who were relegated from the 2011–12 I-League season. All 6 teams are divided into two groups of 3. The top team from each group moves on to the Cup proper.

Teams

Matches

Group A

Group B

References

External links 
 The Indian Federation Cup at the-aiff.com

Qualifiers